The 2015 Sydney Roosters season was the 108th in the club's history. They competed in the 2015 National Rugby League season. The Sydney Roosters opened their 2015 season against the North Queensland Cowboys. In 2015, Trent Robinson coached the Sydney Roosters. Jake Friend and Mitchell Pearce captained the team in 2015 along with two vice-captains in Boyd Cordner and Jared Waerea-Hargreaves. The Sydney Roosters completed their 2015 regular season as Minor Premiers for the third year in a row, defeating the South Sydney Rabbitohs 30 – 0. The Sydney Roosters 2015 season ended in defeat against the Brisbane Broncos 31 – 12.

2015 squad

Squad movements

2015 results

Auckland Nines

Pre-season

Regular season

Finals

Ladder

Player statistics

Representative honours

References

External links

 National Rugby League
 Rugby League Project
 Sydney Roosters
 Zero Tackle

Sydney Roosters seasons
Sydney Roosters season